The Ministry of Foreign Affairs is one of the governmental bodies of Kuwait and part of the cabinet. It was started in 1961.

History and overview
In 1961, a Foreign Affairs Department Bureau was established in Kuwait to organize the foreign relations of the country. This body was soon relaunched as the Ministry of Foreign Affairs, becoming the first ministerial body of the country.

The first foreign minister of Kuwait was Sabah Al Salim Al Sabah. He was followed by Sheikh Sabah Al Ahmed Al Jaber Al Sabah.

The Ministry of Foreign Affairs of the State of Kuwait delegates ambassadors and military attachés bureau in foreign diplomatic missions in countries such as the United States, Russia, United Kingdom, Germany, France, China, Italy and Korea.

List of ministers of foreign affairs and deputy prime ministers

See also
 Foreign relations of Kuwait

References

1961 establishments in Kuwait
Kuwait
Foreign affairs
Kuwait